A rasika is a term for an aesthete of Indian classical music. The term is derived from the Sanskrit word 'rasa', meaning full of passion, elegant, and with discrimination. Connoisseur - An expert able to appreciate a field; especially in the fine arts.

A rasika is a term for audience in Sinhalese as well.

In the context of carnatic music 
A rasika, in carnatic music terminology, is a person who has some knowledge of carnatic music and is able to appreciate carnatic music. In carnatic music concerts (or katcheri, as they are called), the audience is usually called rasikas. With its origins in Sanskrit, the word is used across India, and followers of North Indian (Hindusthani) Music are also referred by the same term.

References 

Carnatic music
Sanskrit words and phrases
Aesthetics
Hindustani music terminology